Alberta Johanna Meijer-Smetz (1893-1953) was a Dutch painter.

Biography 
Meijer-Smetz née Smetz was born on 12 August 1893 in Nieuwer-Amstel. She studied at the Rijksakademie van beeldende kunsten (State Academy of Fine Arts) in Amsterdam.

Her work was included in the 1939 exhibition and sale Onze Kunst van Heden (Our Art of Today) at the Rijksmuseum in Amsterdam.

Meijer-Smetz died on 16 August 1953 in Blaricum.

External links
images of Meijer-Smetz's work on Invaluable

References

1893 births
1953 deaths
20th-century Dutch women artists